Abrocomes was a son of king Darius I of Persia and his wife Phratagune, who died with his full brother Hyperanthes in the battle of Thermopylae, while fighting over the body of Leonidas.

References

Further reading 
The history of Herodotus, Volume 2 at Project Gutenberg

Battle of Thermopylae
Year of birth unknown
480 BC deaths
Achaemenid princes
Persian people of the Greco-Persian Wars
Military leaders of the Achaemenid Empire
5th-century BC Iranian people